Zamarovce is a village and municipality in Trenčín District in the Trenčín Region of north-western Slovakia. It is situated mostly on the right bank of the Váh river. The municipality lies at an altitude of 215 metres and covers an area of 3.928 km².

Etymology
The name comes from Slovak Somárovce (somár - donkey).

History
In historical records, the village was first mentioned in 1208 as Villa Samar. In that time, the area was property of the Zamarovsky family. In 1989, Zamarovce became an independent municipality after it was separated from Trenčín.

Population
Zamarovce has a population of about 796 people. Most of the inhabitants are employed in factories in Trenčín, a local cooperative, or a brickfield plant. Notable people are pedagogue and historian Pavel Hičoldt and the doctor, traveller, and Alaska gold-digger Alexander Liska.

Sights
A first half of the 19th century mansion can be found in Zamarovce. A sports center is on the left bank of the Váh.

External links
https://web.archive.org/web/20071027094149/http://www.statistics.sk/mosmis/eng/run.html

Sources

Villages and municipalities in Trenčín District